Methylphenyltetrahydropyridine N-monooxygenase is an enzyme with systematic name 1-methyl-4-phenyl-1,2,3,6-tetrahydropyridine:oxygen N-oxidoreductase. This enzyme catalyses the following chemical reaction

 1-methyl-4-phenyl-1,2,3,6-tetrahydropyridine + O2  1-methyl-4-phenyl-1,2,3,6-tetrahydropyridine N-oxide + methanol

Methylphenyltetrahydropyridine N-monooxygenase is a flavoprotein.

References

External links 
 

EC 1.13.12